Jean Heysterbach, O.P. (died 1447) was a Roman Catholic prelate who served as Auxiliary Bishop of Augsburg (1436–1447).

Biography
Jean Heysterbach was ordained a priest in the Order of Preachers. On 10 Feb 1436, he was appointed during the papacy of Pope Eugene IV as Auxiliary Bishop of Augsburg and Titular Bishop of Adramyttium. On 26 Feb 1436, he was consecrated bishop by André Dias de Escobar, Titular Bishop of Megara, with Laurent de Cardi, Bishop of Sagone, and Giovanni de Bertoldi, Bishop of Fano, serving as co-consecrators. He served as Auxiliary Bishop of Augsburg until his death on 1447.

References 

15th-century Roman Catholic bishops in Bavaria
Bishops appointed by Pope Eugene IV
1447 deaths
Dominican bishops